Gad Saad (born 13 October 1964) is a Lebanese-Canadian marketing professor at the John Molson School of Business at Concordia University. He is known for applying evolutionary psychology to marketing and consumer behaviour. He also writes a blog for Psychology Today and hosts a YouTube channel titled "The Saad Truth".

Early life and education 
Saad was born in 1964 in Beirut, Lebanon, to a Jewish family. His family fled in October 1975 to Montreal, Quebec, Canada, to escape the Lebanese Civil War. His older brother, David Saad, is a judoka who competed in the men's lightweight event at the 1976 Summer Olympics.

He obtained a B.Sc. (mathematics and computer science) and M.B.A. from McGill University, and an M.Sc. and Ph.D. from Cornell University. Saad's doctoral adviser was J. Edward Russo, the mathematical and cognitive psychologist and behavioral decision theorist.

Saad's nephew is Ariel Helwani, an MMA journalist.

Saad is an atheist who describes himself as culturally Jewish.

Career 
Saad has been a professor of marketing at Concordia University since 1994. As of 2020, he holds the Concordia University Research Chair in Evolutionary Behavioural Sciences and Darwinian Consumption. During this time he has also held visiting professorships at Cornell University, Dartmouth College, and the University of California, Irvine. He was an associate editor for the journal Evolutionary Psychology from 2012 to 2015. He is an advisory fellow for the Centre for Inquiry Canada.

Saad hosts a YouTube show titled The Saad Truth. As of February 2021, his channel has received more than 22 million views.

Saad writes a blog for Psychology Today titled Homo Consumericus.

Research 
One line of research that Saad has been exploring is how hormones affect consumers and the decisions they make. Examples of this research include how showy products affect testosterone levels, how testosterone levels affect various forms of risk-taking, and how hormones in the menstrual cycle affect buying decisions. Another line of research has involved gift giving, including how men and women differ in why they give.

Coverage and interviews
Saad has been profiled in the Toronto Star and his life story was documented by the Télévision française de l'Ontario. His views have also been mentioned in The Economist, Forbes, Chatelaine, Time, The Globe and Mail, and The New York Times.

Saad had been a contributing author for The Huffington Post and The Wall Street Journal.

Saad appeared on Reason TV in November 2011. In September 2015, Saad was interviewed by TJ Kirk on the Drunken Peasants Podcast.

As of 2022, he had been featured on seven episodes of Joe Rogan's podcast The Joe Rogan Experience. In February 2022, Spotify removed 70 episodes of the podcastincluding one where Saad was featuredreportedly at Rogan's own request.

Saad has also appeared on Sam Harris's Making Sense podcast (then titled Waking Up), The Adam Carolla Show, Talk Nerdy with Cara Santa Maria, and The Rubin Report.

Honours and awards 
 Distinguished Teaching Award – John Molson School of Business (2000)
 Darwinism Applied Award – Applied Evolutionary Psychology Society (AEPS) (2014)

Bibliography

Books 
 Saad, G. (2007). The Evolutionary Bases of Consumption.  Mahwah, NJ: Lawrence Erlbaum. . Book review
 Saad, G. (ed.) (2011). Evolutionary Psychology in the Business Sciences.  Springer: Heidelberg, Germany. . Book review
 Saad, G. (2011). The Consuming Instinct: What Juicy Burgers, Ferraris, Pornography, and Gift Giving Reveal About Human Nature. Amherst, NY: Prometheus Books. . Book review
 Saad, G. (2020). The Parasitic Mind: How Infectious Ideas Are Killing Common Sense. Washington, DC: Regnery Publishing. .

Selected journal articles 
 "Sex Differences in the Ultimatum Game:  An Evolutionary Psychology Perspective". Journal of Bioeconomics. (2001).
 "The Effect of Conspicuous Consumption on Men's Testosterone Levels". Organizational Behavior and Human Decision Processes. (2009).
 "Future of evolutionary psychology". Futures. (2011).
 "Evolutionary consumption". Journal of Consumer Psychology. (2013).
 "The framing effect when evaluating prospective mates: An adaptationist perspective". Evolution and Human Behavior. (2014).

References

External links 
 

1964 births
Living people
Anglophone Quebec people
Canadian YouTubers
Canadian cognitive scientists
Academic staff of Concordia University
Conservatism in Canada
Cornell University alumni
Cornell University faculty
Critics of creationism
Critics of religions
Critics of multiculturalism
Critics of postmodernism
Dartmouth College faculty
Evolutionary psychologists
Jewish Canadian scientists
Jews from Quebec
Lebanese emigrants to Canada
Lebanese Jews
Male critics of feminism
McGill University Faculty of Management alumni
People from Beirut
Scientists from Montreal
Canadian political scientists
20th-century Canadian scientists
21st-century Canadian scientists
Secular Jews